Castle Butte may refer to:

Places
Castle Butte, Arizona, unincorporated community
Castle Butte Township, Pennington County, South Dakota, township
Castle Butte Township, Perkins County, South Dakota, township

Buttes
Castle Butte (Canada), a sandstone and compressed clay outcrop in Saskatchewan
Castle Butte (Fergus County), a butte in Fergus County, Montana
Castle Butte (Garfield County), a butte in Garfield County, Montana
Castle Butte (Rosebud County), a butte in Rosebud County, Montana
Castle Butte (Sweet Grass County), a butte in Sweet Grass, Montana
Castle Butte (Valley County), a butte in Valley County, Montana
Castle Butte (Yellowstone County), a butte in Yellowstone County, Montana
Castle Butte (Kern County), a butte in California City, Kern County, California.
Castle Dome (butte), a butte near Yuma, Arizona